The Canadian Rockies Trail Guide by Brian Patton and Bart Robinson, describes 225 hiking and backpacking trails in the Canadian Rockies, including in Banff National Park and Jasper National Park. The first edition was published in 1971, with subsequent editions in 1978, 1986, 1990, 1992, 1994, 2000, 2007, 2011, and 2022 (10th edition). The book is published by Summerthought Publishing of Banff, Alberta. Trail updates are supplied by the book's authors on their Canadian Rockies hiking blog.

For each trail, the book lists:
 the length of time normally required to complete the trail
 the amount of elevation gain or loss, in metres and feet
 the maximum elevation in metres and feet
 the topographic map(s) covering the area
 how to get to the trailhead including GPS
 distances, in kilometres, to notable features along the way
 detailed description

The tenth (ISBN 978-1-926983-53-0) edition contains over 250 colour photographs and 34 maps.

External links
 Canadian Rockies hiking blog

1971 non-fiction books
Canadian Rockies
Canadian travel books
Hiking books
Books about Alberta